Todd Tobias (born 1967) is an American multi-instrumentalist and record producer, best known for his work with Robert Pollard and his band Guided by Voices. Other projects include Circus Devils, Kramies, The Library Is On Fire, and musical theater composer and lyricist George Griggs.

Tobias began producing albums in 2002, first working with indie rock pioneers Guided By Voices on their album Universal Truths And Cycles.  One year earlier in 2001, Tobias joined Guided By Voices front man Robert Pollard and brother Tim Tobias in the psychedelic rock trio Circus Devils (2001-2017).

In 2012, Tobias began recording solo albums of instrumental, atmospheric mood music ranging in style from ambient to post-rock.  Todd's debut album Medicine Show, released on Hidden Shoal Recordings.  has been described as "a multi-faceted instrumental opus, evoking a shadowy steampunk dystopia."

In 2013, Tobias released I RAZOR, a soundtrack album for the experimental film of the same name, followed by Impossible Cities in 2014 and Tristes Tropiques in 2015.  Todd's EP Moorea was featured in John Diliberto's NPR program Echoes' top 25 in September, 2015.

In 2018, Tobias joined with English vocalist and songwriter Chloe March on the ambient album Amialluma, on which vocalist March invented a language to accompany Tobias' music. Also in 2018, the self-titled debut from the psychedelic rock duo Moonchy & Tobias was released, featuring music composed by Tobias and vocals/lyrics by Italian vocalist Pat Moonchy. Other collaborations include The World Of Dust with Dutch musician Stefan Breuer, and Brother Earth with Steve Five.

Discography

Albums and EPs
 Medicine Show (2012)
 Night Above Ground (2012)
 I Razor (2013)
 Impossible Cities (2014)
 Impossible Cities 2 (2014)
 Tristes Tropiques (2015)
 Moorea (2015)
 Gila Man (2016)
 Massabu Evening Entertainments (2018)
 Amialluma (with Chloe March) (2018)

Discography for Todd Tobias as producer/ performer/ writer 

2021:
The World Of Dust: True Sound 
Moonchy & Tobias: Venus Mirror 

2020:
Moonchy & Tobias: III 

2019:
The World Of Dust: Samsara 
Moonchy & Tobias: Atmosfere 

2018:
Moonchy & Tobias: self-titled 

2017:
Circus Devils: Laughs Last 

2015:
Robert Pollard: Faulty Superheroes 
Circus Devils: Stomping Grounds 
The World Of Dust: Womb Realm 
The Flower Machine: Tangerines and Opium Trees

2014:
Circus Devils: "Escape" 
Brother Earth: "Positive Haywires"

2013:
Robert Pollard: Blazing Gentlemen Robert Pollard: Honey Locust Honky Tonk 
Kramies: The Wooden Heart 
Circus Devils: When Machines Attack 
Circus Devils: My Mind Has Seen the White Trick 
King Pedestrian: King Pedestrian

2012:
Robert Pollard: Jack Sells The Cow 
Robert Pollard: Mouseman Cloud 
Guided by Voices: The Bears for Lunch 
Guided by Voices: Class Clown Spots a UFO 
Kramies:The European 
The No Real Need: Nonlocal Motives
Brother Earth: Brother Earth III 
Scarcity Of Tanks: Ohio Captives
Johnny Render: Rendervoux

2011:
Robert Pollard: Lord of the Birdcage 
Robert Pollard: Space City Kicks 
Circus Devils: Capsized! 
Clouds Forming Crowns: Allowing Thunderhead 
The Library is on Fire: Works On Paper 
The Flower Machine: Lavender Lane

2010:
Robert Pollard: Moses on a Snail 
Robert Pollard: We All Got Out of the Army 
Circus Devils: Mother Skinny 
The Celebrity Pilots: Hawks of the Lesser Antilles 
The Library is on Fire: Magic Bumrush Heartz
Brother Earth: Pajama Party 
Clouds Forming Crowns: Ouija Board Taxman 
Hospital garden: Hospital garden

2009:
Robert Pollard: The Crawling Distance
Robert Pollard:  Elephant Jokes
Circus Devils: Gringo 
The Sleeptalkers: Back to Earth 
Kramies: Castle of Ghosts 
The No Real Need: Thistles Where We Slept 
Ceiling Star: New Advances in the Field of Obsolescence

2008:
Robert Pollard: Robert Pollard Is Off to BusinessCircus Devils: ATAXIA 
Slark Martyr: Cave in the A-FrameKramies: Golden Like a New ThingThe Softrocks: Summer ApocalypseThe Frozen Hellsicles: Oh No Wait a Minute...Humphry Clinker: Among Cutting Threads EPSlark Martyr: Imagination and a Pile of Dirt2007:
Circus Devils: Sgt. DiscoRobert Pollard: Standard Gargoyle Decisions 
Robert Pollard: Coast to Coast Carpet of Love 
Robert Pollard: Silverfish Trivia 
Psycho and the Birds: We've Moved 
The Celebrity Pilots: Spooky Action 
The Library is on Fire: Cassette 
George Griggs:  Transmitter ManCoffinberry: God Dam Dogs 
Humphry Clinker: What’s the Story With the Knife? 
The Sorrys: The Last Clear Thought Before You Fall Backwards2006:
Robert Pollard: From a Compound Eye 
Robert Pollard: Normal Happiness 
Brian Lisik: Happiness is Boring 
Clouds Forming Crowns: Race to the Blackout 
Psycho and the Birds: All that is HolyPsycho and the Birds: Check your Zoo EP2005:
The Celebrity Pilots: Beneath the Pavement, a Beach! 
Clouds Forming Crowns: self-titledCircus Devils: FIVEThe Moping Swans: Lightning Head to Coffee Pot2004:
Guided by Voices: Half Smiles of the Decomposed  
Robert Pollard: Fiction Man 
Clouds Forming Crowns: All the Pharmacies  
Circus Devils: Pinball Mars2003:
Guided by Voices: Earthquake Glue2002:
Guided by Voices: Universal Truths and CyclesCircus Devils: The harold pig memorialGuided by Voices: The Pipe Dreams of Instant Prince Whippet2001:
Circus Devils: Ringworm Interiors''

References

External links
 Todd Tobias' web site
 Todd Tobias at Hidden Shoal Recordings
 Interview with Todd Tobias at TapeOp.com
 Circus Devils band website
 Todd Tobias at Tiny Room Records
 Moonchy & Tobias website
 Robert Pollard's website

Record producers from Ohio
American multi-instrumentalists
American experimental musicians
Musicians from Akron, Ohio